Andy S. Jagoda (born 1952) is an American physician and Professor and Chair Emeritus of the Department of Emergency Medicine at Mount Sinai Hospital in New York City. He has edited and authored 14 books, including The Good Housekeeping Family First Aid Book   and the textbook Neurologic Emergencies. He is an editor of the 9th edition of Rosen’s Emergency Medicine.

Life
Jagoda is the son of a Jewish singer, Flory Papo Jagoa, and her husband, builder Harry Jagoda.  He is one of four siblings including two sisters, Lori and Betty, and brother, Elliot, who died in 2014.  He is married to retired neuro-psychiatrist Silvana Riggio.  He also has an adult daughter from a previous relationship.

He received his medical degree from Georgetown University in 1982. He completed a residency in emergency medicine at the joint program of Georgetown/George Washington/Maryland Institute for Emergency Medical Services System in 1985.

As a doctor in the United States Navy, Jagoda completed two tours in the Middle East, first during the Iran-Iraq War, and then again during Desert Storm/Desert Shield.  In 1990, he earned the rank of lieutenant commander. He was later made Assistant Professor at the Department of Military Medicine/Emergency Medicine at the Uniformed Services University of the Health Sciences in Bethesda, Maryland. He was discharged from the navy in 1991.

After his military service, Jagoda joined the faculty of George Washington University, then the University of Florida. He joined the staff at Mount Sinai Medical Center in 1995, earning the rank of Professor of Emergency Medicine with tenure in 2000. In 2009, he was named Chair of the Department of Emergency Medicine.

Jagoda is Editor-in-chief of Emergency Medicine Practice. He is a member of the Executive Committee of the Brain Attack Coalition at the National Institute of Neurological Disorders and Stroke (part of the National Institutes of Health) and of the Executive Board of the Foundation for Education and Research on Neurologic Emergencies (FERNE). He is also on the advisory board of the Indian Head Injury Foundation and of the Brain Trauma Foundation where he also serves as the EMS Director. He is past chair of the Clinical Policies Committee of the American College of Emergency Physicians (ACEP), where his work with the committee for 14 years facilitated the evolution from a consensus-based process to an evidence-based process and promoted ACEP’s practice guideline methodology both nationally and internationally. He has organized evidence-based symposiums in Italy, the Netherlands, and Chile and co-organized the first Joint ACEP/Italian Congress on Emergency Medicine (in Torino).

Jagoda was the supervising physician on duty when David Newman sexually abused a patient in the Mount Sinai emergency room, a crime for which Newman was later sentenced to two years in prison.  He was one of the litigants in the victim's subsequent lawsuit.

Books
The Good Housekeeping Family First Aid Book. Andy Jagoda, author. Hearst Publishers. 2000; 295 pages. 
Jagoda A, Riggio S (guest editors): Seizures in the Emergency Department, Emergency Medicine Clinics of North America, W.B. Saunders, Philadelphia, November 1994. 220 pages.
Howell J, Altieri M, Jagoda A, Prescott J, Scott J, Stair T (editors): Emergency Medicine, W.B. Saunders, Philadelphia, 1997; 1735 pages.
Jagoda A, Richardson L (guest editors): Neurologic Emergencies, Emergency Medicine Clinics of North America, W. B. Saunders, Philadelphia, 1997; 230 pages.
Jagoda A, Riggio S (guest editors): Psychiatric Emergencies, Emergency Medicine Clinics of North America, W.B. Saunders, Philadelphia, May 2000.
Henry G, Jagoda A, Little N, Pelligrino T. Neurologic Emergencies. McGraw Hill, New York.  2003; 346 pages. 
Jagoda A. Good Housekeeping Family First Aid Handbook, 2nd Edition.  Hearst Publishers. 2004. 
Henry G, Jagoda A, Little N, Pelligrino T. Neurologic Emergencies, third edition. McGraw Hill, New York.   April 2010; 389 pages. 
Riggio S, Jagoda A. Traumatic Brain Injury. Psychiatry Clinics of North America. Elsevier, Philadelphia.  December 2010.
Jagoda A,  Sloan E. Seizures in the Emergency Department. Emergency Medicine Clinics of North America. Elsevier, Philadelphia. February 2011. 
Jagoda A, Riggio, S (editors). Traumatic Brain Injury: Improving the Continuum of Care.  Indian Head Injury Foundation Publication.  183 pages.

References

External links
Mount Sinai Hospital homepage
Icahn School of Medicine at Mount Sinai homepage

American medical academics
Georgetown University alumni
George Washington University alumni
Living people
Icahn School of Medicine at Mount Sinai faculty
1952 births